TVOne Pakistan is a general entertainment channel from Pakistan that airs dramas, soaps, sitcoms, and foreign (American, British, Korean, Turkish & Indian) reality and lifestyle programs. Seema Tahir Khan is the CEO and creative head of the channel.

It is a major entertainment channel in Pakistan.

Programming

See also
 Waseb TV
 Sonic TV
 News One
 Radio1 FM91

References

External links

Television stations in Pakistan
Television channels and stations established in 2005
Urdu-language mass media
Television stations in Karachi